The 1984–85 Carlsberg National Basketball League season was the thirteenth season of the National Basketball League formed in 1972.
The league was sponsored by Carlsberg and the Kingston Kings completed a League & Cup double but Manchester United won the newly extended Play Off's.

Team changes
The EBBA increased the first division to fourteen teams which resulted in a 26-match schedule which was warmly welcomed after the 36-match schedule of the previous season. Of the 13 existing teams, Brighton switched to Worthing and with new sponsors would be known as the Nissan Worthing Bears and Hemel Hempstead merged with the second division outfit Watford Royals to form Hemel & Watford Royals. The new fourteenth team was Telford Turbos who secured a new sponsor called Screen Stars.

It was evident that as the season progressed many clubs had been spending beyond their means in recent years and were duly struggling to balance the books. The Solent Stars applied for voluntary liquidation in December 1984 despite leading the league and terminated the contract of their coach Jim Kelly and leading players to save money.  An extraordinary season continued in January 1985 when just a few days before the National Cup final Manchester United F.C. bought the FSO Cars Liverpool & Warrington club, renaming them for the final and relocating to Stretford. The drama continued as Portsmouth F.C. attempted to takeover Solent Stars before a former Stars player TJ Robinson headed a consortium to save the club. Portsmouth F.C. then bought Telford Turbos (also in liquidation) and moved the team to Portsmouth.

Carlsberg League standings

First Division

Team changed name mid-season +

Second Division

Carlsberg playoffs

Quarter-finals

Semi-finals

Third Place

Final

Kellogg's National Cup

Second round

Quarter-finals

Semi-finals

Final

References

See also
Basketball in England
British Basketball League
English Basketball League
List of English National Basketball League seasons

National Basketball League (England) seasons
 
British